The Magnitsky Act, formally known as the Russia and Moldova Jackson–Vanik Repeal and Sergei Magnitsky Rule of Law Accountability Act of 2012, is a bipartisan bill passed by the U.S. Congress and signed into law by President Barack Obama in December 2012, intending to punish Russian officials responsible for the death of Russian tax lawyer Sergei Magnitsky in a Moscow prison in 2009 and also to grant permanent normal trade relations status to Russia.

The Global Magnitsky Act of 2016 within the NDAA 2017 authorizes the U.S. government to sanction those foreign government officials worldwide that are human rights offenders, freeze their assets, and ban them from entering the U.S.

Background
In 2009, Russian tax lawyer Sergei Magnitsky died in a Moscow prison after investigating a $230 million fraud involving Russian tax officials. Magnitsky was accused of committing the fraud himself by Russian officials and detained. While in prison, Magnitsky developed gall stones, pancreatitis and calculous cholecystitis and was not given medical treatment for months. After almost a year of imprisonment, he was beaten to death while in custody.

Magnitsky's friend Bill Browder, a prominent American-born businessman working extensively in Russia after the collapse of the Soviet Union, publicized the case and lobbied American officials to pass legislation sanctioning Russian individuals involved in corruption. Browder brought the case to Senators Benjamin Cardin and John McCain, who proceeded to propose legislation.

Law
In June 2012, the United States House Committee on Foreign Affairs reported to the House a bill called the Sergei Magnitsky Rule of Law Accountability Act of 2012 (H.R. 4405). The main intention of the law was to punish Russian officials who were thought to be responsible for the death of Sergei Magnitsky by prohibiting their entrance to the United States and their use of its banking system. The legislation was taken up by a Senate panel the next week, sponsored by Senator Ben Cardin, and cited in a broader review of the mounting tensions in the international relationship. Browder later wrote that the Magnitsky Act found quick bipartisan support because the corruption exposed by Magnitsky was blatant beyond dispute, and "[t]here wasn't a pro-Russian-torture-and-murder lobby to oppose it."p. 329

The Obama administration fought the bill until Congress signaled the 2012 Jackson–Vanick bill would not be repealed unless the Magnitsky Act passed. In November 2012, provisions of the Magnitsky bill were attached to a House bill (H.R. 6156) normalizing trade with Russia (i.e., repealing the Jackson–Vanik amendment) and Moldova. On December 6, 2012, the U.S. Senate passed the House version of the law, 92–4. The law was signed by President Barack Obama on December 14, 2012.

Individuals affected
In April 2013, the Obama administration made public a list of 18 individuals affected by the Act. The people included on the list were:

Aleksandar Hristov Nikolov, former AEC Kozloduy CEO
Aleksey Droganov
Aleksey Krivoruchko, Tverskoy District Court judge
Andrey Pechegin, deputy head of the investigation supervision division of the general prosecutor's office
Artem (Artyom) Kuznetsov, a tax investigator for the Moscow division of the Ministry of Internal Affairs
Dmitriy Komnov, head of Butyrka Detention Center
Dmitri M. Tolchinskiy
Ivan Pavlovitch Prokopenko
Kazbek Dukuzov, Chechen acquitted of the murder of Paul Klebnikov
Lecha Bogatyrov, implicated by Austrian authorities as the murderer of Umar Israilov
Natalya V. Vinogradova
Oleg F. Silchenko, a senior investigator for the Ministry of Internal Affairs

Olga Stepanova, head of Moscow Tax Office No. 28
Pavel Karpov, a senior investigator for the Moscow division of the Ministry of Internal Affairs
Sergei G. Podoprigorov, Tverskoy District Court judge
Svetlana Ukhnalyova
Yelena Khimina, Moscow tax official
, Tverskoy District Court judge who prolonged Magnitsky's detention
Other foreign individuals who have been sanctioned include:

Abdulaziz al-Hasawi, Bodyguard of Mohammed bin Salman, involved with the Assassination of Jamal Khashoggi
Abdulhamit Gül, Turkish Minister of Justice
Abuzayed Vismuradov, commander of the Terek SOBR of Chechnya
Aivars Lembergs, Former Mayor of Ventspils, Latvia
Ahmed Abdullah al-Jubouri, Former Governor of Saladin Governorate, Iraq
Akram al-Kaabi, founder and secretary general of Harakat Hezbollah al-Nujaba
Álvaro López Miera, Cuban Minister of Defense
Angel Rondon, former Commercial Representative of Odebrecht, Dominican Republic
Aung Aung, Brigadier General, involved in Rohingya conflict
Aung Kyaw Zaw, Burmese Commander, involved in Rohingya conflict
Badr al-Otaibi, Member of General Intelligence Presidency, involved with the Assassination of Jamal Khashoggi
Carrie Lam, Chief Executive of HKSAR
Chen Quanguo, Secretary of the Xinjiang Uyghur Autonomous Region
Chris Tang, Commissioner of Hong Kong Police Force (HKPF)
Dan Gertler, Businessman and Associate of Joseph Kabila
Delyan Peevski, MP of the National Assembly, Bulgaria
Eric Chan, Secretary General, Committee for Safeguarding National Security of the HKSAR
Erick Tsang, HKSAR Secretary for Constitutional and Mainland Affairs
Fahad al-Balawi, Member of Saudi Royal Guard, involved with the Assassination of Jamal Khashoggi
Félix Bautista, senator for the province of San Juan, Dominican Republic.
Fidel Moreno, de facto mayor of Managua, Nicaragua
Filipos Woldeyohannes, Chief of Staff of the Eritrean Defence Forces
Francisco "Chico" Lopez, treasurer of the Nicaraguan Sandinistas Party and head of Albanisa, a holding of companies made out of Venezuelan aid
Francisco Diaz, Head of the Nicaraguan police
Gebran Bassil, President of the Free Patriotic Movement
Horacio Cartes, former president of Paraguay
Hugo Velázquez, sitting vice president of Paraguay
Huo Liujun, former police chief of the Xinjiang Uyghur Autonomous Region
 Ivan Genov Genov , former AEC Kozloduy CEO
Kale Kayihura, Former Inspector General of the Uganda Police Force
Khalid al-Otaibi, Member of Saudi Royal Guard, involved with the Assassination of Jamal Khashoggi
Khin Hlaing, Head of Burmese 99th LID, involved in Rohingya conflict
Khin Maung Soe, Burmese General, involved In Maung Nu massacre
Kun Kim, former Joint Chief of Staff of the Royal Cambodian Armed Forces
Luo Huining, Director of the Hong Kong Liaison Office of China
Maher Mutrab, Saudi Arabian diplomat, involved with the Assassination of Jamal Khashoggi
Mansour Abahussain, Member of General Intelligence Presidency, involved with the Assassination of Jamal Khashoggi
Marián Kočner, Judged for ordering the murder of a Slovak journalist
Maung Maung Soe, Head of armed forces in western Myanmar, involved in Rohingya conflict
Meshal Saad al-Bostani (d. 2018), Member of Royal Saudi Air Force, involved with the Assassination of Jamal Khashoggi
Min Aung Hlaing, Head of the State Administrative Council and Commander in Chief of the Burmese Armed Forces
Mohammed al-Otaibi, Saudi Consul-General of Turkey, involved with the Assassination of Jamal Khashoggi
Mohammed al-Zahrani, Member of Saudi Royal Guard, involved with the Assassination of Jamal Khashoggi
Musa Baluku, Leader of the Allied Democratic Forces
Mustafa al-Madani, Body double of Jamal Khashoggi, involved with the Assassination of Jamal Khashoggi
Naif Alrifi, Associate of Mohammed bin Salman, involved with the Assassination of Jamal Khashoggi
Nawfel Akoub, Former Governor of Mosul, Iraq
Nikolai Malinov, leader of political movement "Rusofili for Bulgaria"
Nofal Hammadi al-Sultan, Former Governor of Nineveh Governorate, Iraq
Qais Khazali, Leader of Asa'ib Ahl al-Haq
Ramzan Kadyrov, head of the Chechen Republic
Rao Anwar, former Senior Superintendent of Police in Malir District, Karachi, Pakistan
Rayan al-Kildani, Leader of Babylon Brigade
Raimbek Matraimov, ex-Deputy Chairman of the State Customs Service (Kyrgyzstan)
Roberto Legra Sotolongo, former Cuban Minister of Justice
 Rumen Ovcharov, former Bulgarian energy minister
Ruslan Geremeyev, associate of Ramzan Kadyrov
Saif al-Qahtani, Associate of Mohammed bin Salman, involved with the Assassination of Jamal Khashoggi
Salah Mohammed Tubaigy, Head of Saudi Arabian Forensics Council, involved with the Assassination of Jamal Khashoggi
Saud al-Qahtani, Advisor to Mohammed bin Salman, involved with the Assassination of Jamal Khashoggi
Soe Win, Deputy Commander in Chief of the Burmese Armed Forces
Stephen Lo, former Commissioner of HKPF
Süleyman Soylu, Turkish Minister of Interior
Sun Jinlong, head of the Xinjiang Production and Construction Corps
Thaar al-Harbi, Bodyguard of Mohammed bin Salman, involved with the Assassination of Jamal Khashoggi
Than Oo, Brigadier General, involved in Rohingya conflict
Teresa Cheng, Secretary of Justice of the HKSAR
Thura San Lwin, Head of Myanmar Border Guard Police, involved in Rohingya conflict
Try Pheap, Cambodian Businessman and Tycoon
Turki Alsehri, involved with the Assassination of Jamal Khashoggi
Varney Sherman, former chairman of the Liberian Unity Party
Prince Y Johnson, a former rebel leader who played a prominent role in the first Liberian Civil War. He's currently a senator  of Nimba County
Vasil Bozhkov, Bulgarian billionaire, exiled to Dubai
Vladislav Goranov, former Bulgarian financial minister under GERB.
Waad Qado, Leader of the Shabak 30th Brigade
Waleed Alsehri, Member of Royal Saudi Air Force, involved with the Assassination of Jamal Khashoggi
Wan Kuok-koi, popularly known as Broken Tooth Koi, former leader of the Macau branch of the 14K (triad)
Whang Mingshang, Head of the Xinjiang Public security bureau
Yahya Jammeh, former president of The Gambia
Xia Baolong, Director of the Hong Kong and Macao Affairs Office of the State Council
Zhang Xiaoming, deputy director of the Hong Kong and Macao Affairs Office of the State Council
Zheng Yanxiong, Director of the Office for Safeguarding National Security in the HKSAR
Zhu Hailun, Deputy Secretary of the Xinjiang Uyghur Autonomous Region

January 2017 blacklisting
On January 9, 2017, under the Magnitsky Act, the United States Treasury's Office of Foreign Assets Control updated its Specially Designated Nationals List and blacklisted Aleksandr I. Bastrykin, Andrei K. Lugovoi, Dmitri V. Kovtun, Stanislav Gordievsky, and Gennady Plaksin, which froze any of their assets held by American financial institutions or transactions with those institutions and banned their traveling to the United States.

Actions by the Russian government
In response to the adoption of the Magnitsky Act, the Russian government denied Americans adoption of Russian children, issued its own list of American officials prohibited from entering Russia, and posthumously convicted Magnitsky as guilty. In addition, the Russian government reportedly lobbied against the legislation acting through a public relations company led by Kenneth Duberstein. Later, a Russian lawyer, Natalia Veselnitskaya was hired to lobby against the Magnitsky Act in the US. She set up a meeting with future-president Donald Trump's son, Donald Trump Jr., purportedly to discuss the matter.

Ban on U.S. adoption of Russian children

On December 19, 2012, the State Duma voted 400 to 4 to ban the international adoption of Russian children into the United States. The bill was unofficially named after Dmitri Yakovlev (Chase Harrison), a Russian toddler who died of heat stroke in 2008 when his adoptive American father forgot he was in the back seat of his SUV. The next year, 2013, two additional laws were proposed: one was to prevent US citizens from working with political NGOs in Russia, and a second law, eventually abandoned, prevented any foreigner from speaking on state television if they discredited the state.

Banning some U.S. officials from Russia

On April 13, 2013, Russia released a list banning 18 Americans from entering Russia for alleged human rights violations, in a response to the Magnitsky list. The Russian lawmakers also banned several U.S. officials involved in the prosecution and trial of Russian arms smuggler Viktor Bout and drug smuggler Konstantin Yaroshenko, both serving prison time in the United States:

Reception
Australian expatriate jurist Geoffrey Robertson, who had been representing some of the Magnitsky campaigners, described the Act as "one of the most important new developments in human rights." He added that it provides "a way of getting at the Auschwitz train drivers, the apparatchiks, the people who make a little bit of money from human rights abuses and generally keep under the radar."

State Duma deputy Yevgeny Fedorov argued that the real purpose of the Magnitsky bill was to manipulate key figures in big business and government, with the aim of pro-American policy in the Russian Federation.

In 2018, the British parliament passed a so-called ‘Magnitsky amendment’ to the Sanctions and Anti-Money Laundering Act to give the government the power to impose sanctions on people who commit gross human rights violations.

Bill Van Auken of pro-Putin World Socialist Web Site condemned the United States for what he described as invoking human rights as a cover for realpolitik in the Magnitsky Act, stating that Washington DC officials had supported "far greater crimes, [such] as when Boris Yeltsin in 1993 ordered the bombardment of the Russian White House, the seat of the country’s parliament, killing 62 people".

The controversial 2016 Russian documentary The Magnitsky Act – Behind the Scenes presents a falsified view of Magnitsky, asserting that "Magnitsky was not beaten while in police custody, and that he did not make any specific allegations against individuals in his testimony to Russian authorities". In its review of the controversial documentary, The Guardian includes views of those sceptical of the documentary such as Petras Auštrevičius, Lithuanian member of the European Parliament who also serves on the Foreign Affairs Committee, who said the push to screen the film was one of several moves by the Russian authorities to weaken western confidence in its policy line and secure a review of European Union sanctions against Russia later that year.

In a July 2017 interview on CNN's Fareed Zakaria GPS, Bill Browder discussed the Magnitsky Act and topics such as the reasons why Putin is directly threatened by it, the money given by Russia government to more than 10,000 Russian human-rights abusers, the June 2016 Trump campaign–Russian meeting, and the power and influence of Russian money in Washington, D.C. at the time.

Liberal Russian dissidents Vladimir V. Kara-Murza and Boris Nemtsov both approved of the act, calling it "pro-Russian."

2017 oversight
President Donald Trump gave a memorandum to Congress on the implementation of the Act on April 21, 2017.

In May 2017, US authorities settled a case against Prevezon Holding, one of the companies used for laundering the money exfiltrated from Russia as result of the fraud discovered by Sergey Magnitsky. The settlement dismissed the case, and the real-estate company agreed to pay a $5.8 million fine. Also in May 2017, an investigation was started on the £6.6m allegedly transferred from the fraud scheme into a banking firm in the UK.

On September 8, 2017, President Trump, in a memorandum, delegated authority to alter the financial sanctions in this act to the Secretary of the Treasury, and the issue of visas to the Secretary of State.

Global Magnitsky Act

Passage
In 2016, Congress enacted the Global Magnitsky Human Rights Accountability Act, which allows the U.S. government to sanction foreign government officials implicated in human rights abuses anywhere in the world.

Initially introduced as separate legislation by Senator Benjamin Cardin (D-MD) in the Senate and Representative Chris Smith (R-NJ) in the House, the Global Magnitsky Act was ultimately incorporated as Title XII, Subtitle F (sections 1261 through 1265) of the omnibus National Defense Authorization Act for Fiscal Year 2017 (NDAA FY 2017), which became law on December 23, 2016.

Legal framework
The legal framework for the Global Magnitsky Sanctions consists of the following executive order, multiple public laws (statutes), and regulations:
Executive Order
Executive Order 13818
Statutes
Global Magnitsky Human Rights Accountability Act, 22 U.S.C.§§2656 note
International Emergency Economic Powers Act (IEEPA), 50 U.S.C.§§1701-1706
Code of Federal Regulations
Global Magnitsky Sanctions Regulations, 31 CFR Part 583

Sanctions imposed through EO 13818
Effective 21 December 2017, U.S. President Donald Trump issued Executive Order 13818, the first implementation of the Global Magnitsky Human Rights Accountability Act, under which the U.S. government imposed sanctions against 13 individuals described as "human rights abusers, kleptocrats, and corrupt actors." The decision was announced by US Secretary of the Treasury Steven Mnuchin. President Trump said that he was "declaring a national emergency with respect to serious human-rights abuse and corruption around the world." The sanctioned individuals included Yahya Jammeh, former president of The Gambia, and Roberto Jose Rivas Reyes, president of Nicaragua's Supreme Electoral Council. An additional 39 affiliated companies and individuals were also sanctioned by the Treasury Department's Office of Foreign Assets Control (OFAC).

Dan Gertler 
According to The Economist, Dan Gertler, an "Israeli mining billionaire" and longtime close friend of Joseph Kabila, who was President of the Democratic Republic of the Congo (DRC) for decades, was also listed in President Trump's EO Annex and placed on the OFAC financial sanctions list. All of Gertler's assets that were under U.S. jurisdiction were blocked. According to a February 2018 article in The Economist, the sanctions statement said that Gertler had "amassed his fortune through hundreds of millions of dollars' worth of opaque and corrupt mining and oil deals" in the DRC. Included in the Executive Order is the list of designated entities "affiliated with" Gertler:
African Trans International Holdings B.V.
Almerina Properties Limited
Fleurette Africa Resources I B.V.
Fleurette African Transport B.V.
Fleurette Energy I B.V.
Interlog DRC
Iron Mountain Enterprises Limited
Karibu Africa Services SA
Kitoko Food Farm
Moku Goldmines AG
Moku Mines D'or SA
Oriental Iron Company SPRL
Sanzetta Investments Limited
Ventora Development Sasu.In a November 28, 2019, article in The Economist, it was reported that President Trump's decision to place sanctions on Gertler, who is a close friend of then-President of the Congo, Joseph Kabila, had come as "a shock to many companies operating in the Congo." Citing Tom Perriello, who was then the United States envoy to the African Great Lakes under Barack Obama, the sanctions "probably helped push Mr. Kabila to his eventual decision to stand down in the elections that took place a year later," in the December 2018 general election.

2018 
In June 2018, Félix Bautista, a member of the Senate of the Dominican Republic and five companies owned or controlled by him were sanctioned by the U.S. Department of Treasury under the Global Magnitsky Act due to his involvement in significant corruption. Bautista has reportedly engaged in bribery in relation to his position as a Senator, and is alleged to have engaged in corruption in Haiti, where he used his connections to win public works contracts to help rebuild Haiti following several natural disasters, including one case where his company was paid over $10 million for work not completed.

In July 2018, three Nicaraguans were added to the OFAC sanctions list. Nicaraguan National Police Commissioner Francisco Javier Diaz Madriz (Diaz) and Secretary of the Mayor's Office of Managua Fidel Antonio Moreno Briones (Moreno) were sanctioned for being responsible for, or the leaders of entities involved in, serious human rights abuse in Nicaragua. Additionally, OFAC designated Jose Francisco Lopez Centeno (Lopez), the Vice President of ALBA de Nicaragua (ALBANISA) and President of Petronic, for engaging in corrupt activities.

In August 2018, the Treasury Department sanctioned top Turkish government officials, Turkish Justice Minister Abdulhamit Gül and Interior Minister Süleyman Soylu, who were involved in the detention of American pastor Andrew Brunson. Daniel Glaser, the former Assistant Secretary for Terrorist Financing under President Barack Obama, said: "It’s certainly the first time I can think of" the U.S. sanctioning a NATO ally. "I certainly regard it as a human rights violation to unlawfully detain somebody, so I think it falls within the scope of the Global Magnitsky Act."

In November 2018, the Treasury Department announced the imposition of Global Magnitsky Act sanctions against 17 Saudi Arabian officials who "targeted and brutally killed" Saudi dissident journalist Jamal Khashoggi, who lived and worked in the United States.

2020 
On July 9, 2020, the U.S. Department of the Treasury's Office of Foreign Assets Control (OFAC) sanctioned a Chinese government entity (the Xinjiang Public Security Bureau) and four current or former government officials for serious rights abuses against ethnic minorities in the Xinjiang Uyghur Autonomous Region (XUAR). The sanctions were imposed on the basis of serious human rights abuses which reportedly included mass arbitrary detention and severe physical abuse, among other serious abuses targeting Uyghurs (the Turkic Muslim population indigenous to Xinjiang) and other ethnic minorities in the region.

The four sanctioned individuals were:
Chen Quanguo, Communist Party Secretary of XUAR and former Communist Party Secretary of Tibet (Tibet Autonomous Region)
Zhu Hailun, former Deputy Party Secretary of the XUAR
Wang Mingshan, incumbent Communist Party Secretary of the Xinjiang Public Security Bureau (XPSB)
Huo Liujun, former Communist Party Secretary of the XPSB
On July 31, 2020, the OFAC further sanctioned Xinjiang Production and Construction Corps (XPCC), Sun Jinlong, a former Political Commissar of the XPCC, and Peng Jiarui, the Deputy Party Secretary and Commander of the XPCC, for their connection to similar human rights abuses against the ethnic minorities in XUAR.

The XPCC is a paramilitary organization in the XUAR subordinate to the Chinese Communist Party (CCP), created to enhance internal control over the region. XPCC was used by XUAR CCP Secretary Chen Quanguo, who was subject to similar sanctions on July 9, 2020, to implement a comprehensive surveillance, detention, and indoctrination program targeting Uyghurs and other ethnic minority groups. The sanction generally prohibits all transactions by U.S. persons or taking place within the United States involving any property or interests in property of the sanctioned entities. The sanctions are listed by the OFAC as part of "an ongoing effort to deter human rights abuses in the Xinjiang region."

2021 
Filipos Woldeyohannes, Chief of Staff of the Eritrean Defence Forces (EDF), was sanctioned under the Magnitsky Act on August 23, 2021, for his command responsibility as head of the EDF, involved in war crimes and sexual violence in the Tigray War.

In Paraguay, Kassem Mohamad Hijazi, Khalil Ahmad Hijazi and Liz Paola Doldan, despachantes (dispatchers) operating in the tri-border area of Brazil, Paraguay and Argentina, and whose money laundering operation was estimated to have amassed hundreds of millions of dollars, were also sanctioned by the act.

Sanctions imposed through EO 13936 

On August 7, 2020, the U.S. Department of Treasury sanctioned 11 individuals "for undermining Hong Kong's autonomy and restricting the freedom of expression or assembly of the citizens of Hong Kong."

These sanctions were made pursuant to Executive Order (E.O.) 13936, which was issued on July 14, 2020, by President Trump to declare a national emergency with respect to the situation in Hong Kong, where actions by China "fundamentally undermine Hong Kong's autonomy and democratic processes."

The sanctioned individuals are:
Carrie Lam, Chief Executive of Hong Kong Special Administrative Region (HKSAR)
Chris Tang, Commissioner of Hong Kong Police Force (HKPF) 
Eric Chan, Secretary General, Committee for Safeguarding National Security of the HKSAR
Erick Tsang, HKSAR Secretary for Constitutional and Mainland Affairs
John Lee Ka-chiu, HKSAR Secretary for Security
Luo Huining, Director of the Hong Kong Liaison Office
Stephen Lo, former Commissioner of HKPF
Teresa Cheng, HKSAR Secretary for Justice
Xia Baolong, Director of the Hong Kong and Macao Affairs Office of the State Council
Zhang Xiaoming, deputy director of the Hong Kong and Macao Affairs Office of the State Council
Zheng Yanxiong, Director, Office for Safeguarding National Security in Hong Kong

Calls for additional sanctions 
In September 2017, a group of NGOs and anti-corruption organizations identified 15 international cases where alleged crimes were committed. Individuals from countries, including Azerbaijan, Bahrain, China, the Democratic Republic of the Congo, Egypt, Ethiopia, Liberia, Mexico, Panama, Russia, Saudi Arabia, Tajikistan, Ukraine, Uzbekistan, and Vietnam, were nominated for sanctions.

In December 2017, Americans for Democracy & Human Rights in Bahrain stated that,The Trump Administration has failed to take up cases presented regarding serious human rights abuses committed by Bahraini government officials. Ultimately, there were no individuals or entities from any Arab League member state designated in the Global Magnitsky Act’s first list of designees, despite the submission of eligible cases.In August 2018, Senator Marco Rubio and a bipartisan group of 16 other members of Congress urged the United States to impose sanctions under the Global Magnitsky Act against Chinese officials responsible for human rights abuses against the Uyghur Muslim minority in Xinjiang. In December 2019, the Uyghur Human Rights Policy Act was passed in the House of Representatives, which calls for the imposition of sanctions under the Global Magnitsky Act. The 2019 annual report of the Congressional-Executive Commission on China called for Congress to consider sanctions against Chinese officials under the Global Magnitsky Act for crimes against humanity.

On April 7, 2020, Rep. Chris Smith, called on Secretary of State Mike Pompeo to form a task force "to identify and investigate" Chinese government officials for their role in allegedly silencing doctors and journalists who have spoken out about China's response to the COVID-19 pandemic. Further, Smith suggested that the U.S. apply the Global Magnitsky Act to target specific Chinese officials involved in going after whistleblowers, without punishing the country as a whole.

On December 15, 2021, 18 United States senators co-signed a letter to U.S. Secretary of State Antony Blinken and U.S. Treasury Secretary Janet Yellen, asking them to sanction the NSO Group under the Magnitsky Act, due to the Israeli firm's controversy regarding its Pegasus smartphone spyware product.

Similar laws in other jurisdictions

Canadian Magnitsky Law 

In March 2015, the parliament of Canada passed an initial motion towards passing such a law. Canada's Sergei Magnitsky Law, officially the Justice for Victims of Corrupt Foreign Officials Act, received royal assent and was passed into law on October 18, 2017. The Act is regulated by the Justice for Victims of Corrupt Foreign Officials Regulations.

On November 29, 2018, Canada amended the Regulations to include 17 foreign nationals from Saudi Arabia, who were accused of being responsible for or complicit in gross violations of internationally recognized human rights, particularly the torture and extrajudicial killing of Saudi journalist Jamal Khashoggi.

In Europe 
In March 2019, the European Parliament passed a resolution 447–70 in favor of passing a Magnitsky Act for the European Union. In her September 2020 State of the European Union address, Ursula von der Leyen stated that one of the European Commission's goals was passing a European Magnitsky Act. The EU Global Human Rights Sanctions Regime was enacted in 2020.

On 6 July 2020, United Kingdom’s Foreign Secretary Dominic Raab announced the first sanctions under a law similar to the Global Magnitsky Act, where 47 individuals came under travel restrictions and asset freezes. The regulations were meant to give the government a power to impose sanctions on those involved in the worst human rights abuses around the world.

See also
Dima Yakovlev Law
International sanctions during the Ukrainian crisis
Countering America's Adversaries Through Sanctions Act
The Magnitsky Act – Behind the Scenes (2016 documentary film)
Hong Kong Human Rights and Democracy Act
Uyghur Human Rights Policy Act

References

Further reading

External links

 Magnitsky Act (PDF/details) as amended in the GPO Statute Compilations collection
 Magnitsky Act as enacted in the US Statutes at Large
H.R. 6156: Russia and Moldova Jackson–Vanik Repeal and Sergei Magnitsky Rule of Law Accountability Act of 2012

 
Sanctions legislation
United States sanctions
Sanctions against Russia
Russia–United States relations